Vaneshan (also Romanized as Vāneshān and Vānshān; also known as Barmshān and Vanishan) is a village in Nivan Rural District, in the Central District of khansar County, Isfahan Province, Iran. At the 2006 census, its population was 624, in 233 families.

References 

Populated places in Golpayegan County